Eiji Ochiai (落合 英二, born July 25, 1969) is a former Nippon Professional Baseball pitcher.

External links

1969 births
Living people
Baseball people from Tochigi Prefecture
Nihon University alumni
Japanese baseball players
Nippon Professional Baseball pitchers
Chunichi Dragons players
Japanese baseball coaches
Nippon Professional Baseball coaches
Baseball players at the 1990 Asian Games
Asian Games competitors for Japan